Ekaterina Nedeva (born 10 August 1950) is a Bulgarian athlete. She competed in the women's long jump at the 1976 Summer Olympics and the 1980 Summer Olympics.

References

1950 births
Living people
Athletes (track and field) at the 1976 Summer Olympics
Athletes (track and field) at the 1980 Summer Olympics
Bulgarian female long jumpers
Olympic athletes of Bulgaria
Place of birth missing (living people)